The following is a list of notable deaths in August 2008.

Entries for each day are listed alphabetically by surname. A typical entry lists information in the following sequence:
 Name, age, country of citizenship at birth, subsequent country of citizenship (if applicable), reason for notability, cause of death (if known), and reference.

August 2008

1
Leopoldo Alas Mínguez, 45, Spanish writer, poet and editor.
Carlos Aponte, 69, Colombian footballer.
Rolf Bae, 33, Norwegian mountaineer, climbing accident.
Pauline Baynes, 85, British illustrator (The Chronicles of Narnia, The Lord of the Rings).
Peter Jackson, 80, Australian fashion designer, prostate cancer.
Ashok Mankad, 61, Indian cricketer.
Chief Mqalo, 91, South African Chief of the AmaKhuze Tribe, Alice.
Harkishan Singh Surjeet, 92, Indian politician, cardiac arrest.
Butch White, 72, British cricketer (Hampshire, Glamorgan, England).

2
Fujio Akatsuka, 72, Japanese manga artist, pneumonia.
Frederic Apcar, 93, Russian-born French acrobatic dancer and producer/impresario.
Thomas John Ashton, 3rd Baron Ashton of Hyde, 81, British aristocrat and banker.
Geoffrey Ballard, 76, Canadian businessman and fuel cell scientist, founder of Ballard Power Systems.
Pérez Celis, 69, Argentine plastic artist, leukaemia.
Affonso Évora, 89, Brazilian Olympic bronze medal-winning (1948) basketball player.
Helga Gitmark, 78, Norwegian politician.
Christopher González, 65, Jamaican sculptor and painter, cancer.
Kåre Grøndahl Hagem, 93, Norwegian politician.
Allen Kolstad, 76, American politician, lieutenant governor of Montana (1988–1991), cancer.
Ger McDonnell, 37, Irish mountaineer, first Irishman to reach K2 summit, climbing accident.
Peter Rodman, 64, American foreign policy expert, leukemia.
John F. Seiberling, 89, American politician, representative from Ohio (1971–1987), respiratory failure.

3
Anton Allemann, 72, Swiss footballer (PSV Eindhoven, 1. FC Nürnberg, Grasshopper Zürich), heart attack.
Skip Caray, 68, American broadcaster for baseball (Atlanta Braves) and basketball (Hawks), son of Harry Caray, bronchitis.
Erik Darling, 74, American songwriter, folk musician, lymphoma.
Roger Dean, 65, British guitarist, brain cancer.
Babatunde Jose, 82, Nigerian journalist and newspaper editor.
Jeffrey S. Medkeff, 39, American astronomer and science writer, liver cancer.
Robert Montgomery, 78, American lawyer.
Aurelius H. Piper Sr., 92, American hereditary chief of the Golden Hill Paugussett Indian Nation since 1959, natural causes.
Aleksandr Solzhenitsyn, 89, Russian novelist and historian, Nobel Prize winner (1970), heart failure.
Louis Teicher, 83, American classical pianist (Ferrante & Teicher), heart failure.

4
Alberto Achacaz Walakial, 79, Chilean craftsman, one of the last full-blooded Alacaluf, blood poisoning.
Sally Insul, 92, American actress, heart failure.
Craig Jones, 23, British motorcycle racer, head injuries from a race crash.
Peter Kass, 85, American actor, director and teacher.
Eri Kawai, 43, Japanese pop and classical singer, liver cancer.
Victor McCaffery, 89, Australian cricketer.
Robert Maheu, 90, American businessman, aide to Howard Hughes.
Nicola Rescigno, 92, American opera conductor, complications from broken femur.
Johnny Thio, 63, Belgian football player and coach, myocardial rupture.
Greg Weld, 64, American racing driver and businessman, heart attack.

5
Aziz Abdullah Ahmed, 80-81, Iraqi Kurdish judge, Alzheimer's disease.
Jaroslav Alexa, 59, Czech Olympic athlete.
Bruno Dallansky, 79, Austrian actor.
Robert Hazard, 59, American musician and songwriter ("Girls Just Want to Have Fun"), pancreatic cancer.
Jack Kamen, 88, American comic book artist (Tales from the Crypt, The Vault of Horror), cancer.
Reg Lindsay, 79, Australian country music singer and songwriter, pneumonia.
Shelby Linville, 78, American basketball player (Kentucky Wildcats), cancer.
José Medellín, 33, Mexican convicted murderer, execution in Texas by lethal injection.
Gary Mooney, 78, American animator (Sleeping Beauty, Lady and the Tramp, George of the Jungle), cancer.
Daniel L. Norris, 73, Canadian commissioner of the Northwest Territories (1989–1994), heart failure.
Eva Pflug, 79, German actress (Raumpatrouille Orion).
Manuel de Almeida Trindade, 90, Portuguese bishop of the Roman Catholic Diocese of Aveiro (1962–1988).

6
Bertil Ahlin, 81, Swedish boxer.
Robert Nason Beck, 80, American scientist, myelodysplasia.
John K. Cooley, 80, American author (Unholy Wars), journalist and expert of Middle East affairs, cancer.
Ela-Mana-Mou, 32, British Thoroughbred race horse and sire, euthanized.
Gene Galusha, 66, American actor and narrator.
Roy Howard, 85, Australian cricketer.
Karl Kuehl, 70, American baseball scout, coach and manager (Montreal Expos), pulmonary fibrosis.
Tony Russo, 71, American whistleblower (Pentagon Papers).
Jud Taylor, 68, American television director and actor (Dr. Kildare, Star Trek, Law & Order: Special Victims Unit), kidney failure.
Reg Whitehouse, 75, Canadian football player (Saskatchewan Roughriders).

7
Bernie Brillstein, 77, American film producer (Ghostbusters, The Blues Brothers, ALF), chronic pulmonary disease.
Juan Bustos, 72, Chilean politician, liver cancer.
Simon Gray, 71, British playwright, abdominal aortic aneurysm.
Ralph Klein, 77, Israeli basketball player and coach, intestinal cancer.
Andrea Pininfarina, 51, Italian businessman, CEO of Pininfarina, motorcycle accident.
Clarence Rost, 94, Canadian ice hockey player.

8
Ann-Mari Aasland, 93, Norwegian politician.
Ralph Edward Dodge, 101, American bishop of the Methodist Church.
Antonio Gava, 78, Italian politician, minister of the interior (1988–1990), after long illness.
Orville Moody, 74, American professional golfer, winner of 1969 U.S. Open.
Eleo Pomare, 70, Colombian modern dance choreographer, cancer.
Henk Starreveld, 94, Dutch Olympic canoer.

9
Giorgi Antsukhelidze, 23, Georgian soldier, shot.
Sir Stanley Bailey, 81, British chief constable of Northumbria Police (1975–1991).
Peter Coe, 88, British athletics coach, father of Sebastian Coe.
Colm Condon, 87, Irish lawyer, Attorney General (1965–1973).
Bob Cunis, 67, New Zealand cricketer.
Mahmoud Darwish, 67, Palestinian poet, complications from open heart surgery.
Archie Elliott, Lord Elliott, 85, British judge.
Ken Griffiths, 78, English footballer (Port Vale).
Jacob Landau, 74, American journalist, attorney, co-founder of Reporters Committee for Freedom of the Press, after long illness.
Bernie Mac, 50, American comedian and actor (The Bernie Mac Show, Ocean's Eleven, Friday), complications from pneumonia.
Gilbert Morand, 85, French military patrol runner.
Roy Simmonds, 79, Australian rules footballer (Hawthorn), cancer.
Greg Urwin, 61, Australian diplomat, Secretary General of the Pacific Islands Forum (2004–2008), cancer.
Denis Vetchinov, 32, Russian army major, recipient of Hero of the Russian Federation award, killed in action.
Vivian Shun-wen Wu, 95, Taiwanese entrepreneur, chairwoman of Yulon Motor, heart failure.

10
Louise Armstrong, 71, American children's writer.
Sir William Christie, 95, North Irish politician, Lord Mayor of Belfast (1972–1975).
Lee Clark, 71, Canadian politician, MP for Brandon—Souris (1983–1993).
John Esmonde, 71, British television writer, half of Esmonde and Larbey (Please Sir!, The Good Life).
Isaac Hayes, 65, American soul and funk musician ("Theme from Shaft") and actor (South Park, The Rockford Files), Oscar winner (1972), stroke.
Cezmi Kartay, 88, Turkish civil servant and politician (chairman of SODEP).
William A. Knowlton, 88, American general.
Howard G. Minsky, 94, American film producer (Love Story).
Terence Rigby, 71, British actor (Get Carter, Watership Down, Mona Lisa Smile), lung cancer.
Alexander Slobodyanik, 65, Ukrainian pianist, meningitis.
František Tikal, 75, Czech ice hockey player.
David Young, 76, British Bishop of Ripon (1977–1999).

11
Arase Nagahide, 59, Japanese sumo wrestler, heart failure.
Agneta Bolme Börjefors, 67, Swedish television presenter and royal reporter.
Sheikh Abdul Aziz, 55–56, Kashmir politician, shot.
Henry B. R. Brown, 82, American investment banker, aneurysm.
John S. Bull, 73, American NASA astronaut.
Sir Bill Cotton, 80, British television executive.
George Deem, 75, American artist, lung cancer.
George Furth, 75, American playwright, actor and librettist, collaborator with Stephen Sondheim.
Don Helms, 81, American steel guitarist.
James Hoyt, 83, American soldier, member of the Buchenwald liberation team.
Anatoly Khrapaty, 45, Kazakh Olympic weightlifter (USSR and Kazakhstan), motorcycle accident.
Günther Schifter, 84, Austrian journalist and radio presenter.
Fred Sinowatz, 79, Austrian politician, chancellor of Austria (1983–1986).
Darren Taylor, 42, American gang member turned peacemaker, cancer.
Rhoshii Wells, 31, American boxer, Olympic medallist, shot.

12
Christie Allen, 53, Australian pop singer, pancreatic cancer.
Michael Baxandall, 74, British art historian, Parkinson's disease.
Gilles Bilodeau, 53, Canadian NHL and World Hockey Association player (Quebec Nordiques).
Mick Clough, 80, Australian politician, member of the New South Wales Legislative Assembly (1976–1988, 1991–1999).
Dottie Wiltse Collins, 84, American AAGPBL baseball pitcher (Fort Wayne Daisies).
Leon Dorsey, 32, American serial killer, execution by lethal injection.
Donald Erb, 81, American avant-garde composer.
George Gick, 92, American Major League Baseball player (Chicago White Sox).
Rust Hills, 83, American fiction editor (Esquire), cardiac arrest.
Lester Hogan, 88, American physicist, complications of Alzheimer's disease.
Vilma Jamnická, 101, Austro-Hungarian-born Slovakian actress and astrologer.
Francis Lacassin, 76, French editor.
Patricia W. Malone, 84, American naval officer.
Aditya Prakash, 84, Indian architect.
Herm Schneidman, 94, American football player (Green Bay Packers).
Stan Storimans, 39, Dutch photojournalist and cameraman, mortar fire.
Bill Stulla, 97, American children's television show host.

13
Sandy Allen, 53, American tallest woman in the world (according to Guinness World Records).
Henri Cartan, 104, French mathematician.
Bill Gwatney, 48, American politician, Arkansas state senator (1992–2002), Democratic Party of Arkansas chairman, shot.
John MacDougall, 60, British politician, MP for Glenrothes since 2005 and Central Fife (2001–2005), mesothelioma.
*Nollaig Ó Gadhra, 64, Irish language activist, journalist and historian, co-founder of Teilifís na Gaeilge.
Roy Prosser, 66, Australian international rugby union player, heart attack.
Dino Toso, 39, Italian automotive engineer, Renault F1 director of aerodynamics, cancer.
Jack Weil, 107, American founder of Rockmount Ranch Wear, oldest working CEO.
Stuart Cary Welch, 80, American scholar and collector of Indian and Islamic art.

14
Seiji Aochi, 66, Japanese ski jumper, stomach cancer.
Sandy Bruce-Lockhart, Baron Bruce-Lockhart, 66, British politician and local government leader, cancer.
Ralph Feigin, 70, American pediatrician, lung cancer.
Luigi Grossi, 83, Italian Olympic sprinter.
Percy Irausquin, 39, Aruban fashion designer, cerebral hemorrhage.
Carlton John, 92-93, Trinidadian West Indian cricket umpire.
Marius Maziers, 93, French prelate of the Roman Catholic Church.
Michael Anthony Rodriguez, 45, American murderer, member of the Texas Seven, execution by lethal injection.
Lita Roza, 82, British singer, first British female to top the UK singles chart.
Bob Worthington, 72, American honorary consul of the Cook Islands to the United States (1985–2008).

15
Carlos Meglia, 50, Argentine comic book artist (Cybersix).
James Orthwein, 84, American businessman, cancer.
Gladys Powers, 109, British-born last World War I veteran living in Canada, served with the WAAC and WRAF.
Leroy Sievers, 53, American journalist, colon cancer.
Vic Toweel, 79, South African boxer, bantamweight world champion (1952–1954).
Jerry Wexler, 91, American record producer, heart failure.
Darrin Winston, 42, American baseball player (Philadelphia Phillies, 1997–1998), leukemia.

16
Hugh Butt, 98, American physician.
Dorival Caymmi, 94, Brazilian songwriter and singer, multiple organ failure.
Roberta Collins, 63, American actress (Death Race 2000, Eaten Alive), drug overdose.
Michel-Gaspard Coppenrath, 84, Tahitian archbishop of Papeete (1973–1999), ruptured aneurysm.
Ronnie Drew, 73, Irish singer, founding member of The Dubliners, after long illness.
Jack Dunham, 98, American animator and television producer, creator of the St. Hubert Chicken.
Masanobu Fukuoka, 95, Japanese microbiologist, pioneer of no-till grain cultivation.
Elena Leușteanu, 73, Romanian gymnast and three-time Olympic medalist, pancreatic cancer.
Fanny Mikey, 78, Argentine-born Colombian theatre actress, renal failure.
Johnny Moore, 70, Jamaican trumpeter, founding member of The Skatalites, cancer.
Alfred Rainer, 20, Austrian Nordic combined skier, paragliding accident.
Helge Uuetoa, 71, Estonian stage designer, beaten.

17
Marie Fisher, 77, Australian politician, Member of the New South Wales Legislative Council (1978–1988).
Dave Freeman, 47, American author (100 Things To Do Before You Die), injuries from fall.
Maudie Hopkins, 93, last certified American Civil War widow.
Sir Edwin Nixon, 83, English businessman, chief executive of IBM UK.
Philip Saffman, 77, American mathematician.
Franco Sensi, 82, Italian businessman, president of A.S. Roma since 1993, respiratory failure.

18
Kazys Abromavičius, 80, Lithuanian painter.
Jeannette Eyerly, 100, American author and columnist.
Manny Farber, 91, American film critic and painter.
Bob Humphrys, 56, British BBC sports presenter, lung cancer.
Genuine Risk, 31, American racehorse, 1980 Kentucky Derby winner.
Pervis Jackson, 70, American R&B bass singer (The Spinners), cancer.
Jumoke, 18, American western lowland gorilla, complications of early pregnancy.
Floyd Peters, 72, American football player, complications from Alzheimer's disease.

19
Leo Abse, 91, British politician, MP (1958–1987), reformer of laws on homosexuality and divorce.
Carlos Arguelles, 90, Filipino architect.
Julius Carry, 56, American actor (The Last Dragon, Disco Godfather, Two Guys, a Girl and a Pizza Place), pancreatic cancer.
Binyamin Gibli, 89, Israeli head of military intelligence.
Algimantas Masiulis, 77, Lithuanian actor.
LeRoi Moore, 46, American saxophonist (Dave Matthews Band), complications from ATV accident.
Mikhail Mukasei, 101, Russian spy.
Levy Mwanawasa, 59, Zambian politician, president since 2002, complications from stroke.
Diane Webber, 76, American model and actress.

20
Tunku Abdullah, 83, Malaysian businessman.
Mario Bertok, 79, Croatian chess grandmaster and journalist, drowned.
Marshall Brown, 90, American basketball player and coach.
Chao Yao-tung, 92, Taiwanese minister of economic affairs, multiple organ dysfunction syndrome.
Ed Freeman, 80, American U.S. Army helicopter pilot, recipient of the Medal of Honor, complications of Parkinson's disease.
Phil Guy, 68, American blues guitarist, brother of Buddy Guy, pancreatic cancer.
Larry Hennessy, 79, American basketball player (Philadelphia Warriors, Syracuse Nationals).
*Hua Guofeng, 87, Chinese premier (1976–1980), chairman of the Communist Party of China (1976–1981).
Clair Isbister, 92, Australian paediatrician.
Edward Jaworski, 82, American Olympic water polo player (1952).
Dick Jones, 97, American politician.
Eric Longworth, 90, British actor (Dad's Army).
Leopoldo Serran, 66, Brazilian screenwriter, liver cancer.
Stephanie Tubbs Jones, 58, American member of the House of Representatives from Ohio since 1999, cerebral hemorrhage.
Gene Upshaw, 63, American NFL player (Oakland Raiders), executive director of NFLPA, pancreatic cancer.

21
Robert E. Armstrong, 82, American politician.
Fred Crane, 90, American film and television actor (Gone with the Wind), complications from surgery.
Iosif Constantin Drăgan, 91, Romanian businessman and historian.
Jerry Finn, 39, American record producer (Blink-182, Green Day, Morrissey), cerebral hemorrhage.
Don Fox, 72, British rugby league player (Wakefield).
Buddy Harman, 79, American session musician, heart failure.
Lee Eon, 27, South Korean actor and model, motorcycle accident.
Ágústa Þorsteinsdóttir, 66, Icelandic Olympic swimmer.
Laurence Urdang, 81, American lexicographer, heart failure.
Wolfgang Vogel, 82, German lawyer, negotiator in prisoner exchange programs during the Cold War.

22
Kenny Ailshie, 59, American horse trainer, suicide.
Frank Cornish, 40, American football player (Dallas Cowboys), apparent heart attack.
James H. Faulkner, 92, American publisher, politician and educator.
Jeff MacKay, 59, American film and television actor, (Magnum, P.I., Tales of the Gold Monkey), liver complications.
Michael J. Manning, 65, Australian-born Papua New Guinean anti-corruption activist and economist, heart attack.
Muriel Kallis Steinberg Newman, 94, American abstract expressionist art collector, natural causes.
Robert Pintenat, 60, French football player.
Ralph Young, 90, American singer (Sandler and Young).

23
Jimmy Cleveland, 82, American jazz trombonist.
Ruth Cohen, 78, American actress and extra (Seinfeld), heart attack.
Leo Elter, 78, American football player (Pittsburgh Steelers, Washington Redskins), heart failure.
Steve Foley, 49, American drummer (The Replacements, Bash & Pop), drug overdose.
Doris Gibson, 98, Peruvian journalist, founder of Caretas magazine.
Ian Hibell, 74, British cyclist, hit and run car crash.
Yuri Nosenko, 81, Soviet-born Ukrainian KGB agent who defected to United States, after a long illness.
John Russell, 89, British-born American art critic and author.
Thomas Huckle Weller, 93, American virologist, Nobel Prize winner (Medicine, 1954).

24
Gerard W. Ford, 83, American co-founder of Ford Modeling Agency, endocarditis.
Riitta Immonen, 90, Finnish fashion designer and entrepreneur, co-founder of Marimekko.
Tad Mosel, 86, American Pulitzer Prize–winning playwright (All the Way Home).
Morris Sullivan, 91, American co-founder of Sullivan Bluth Studios (An American Tail, The Land Before Time).
Wei Wei, 88, Chinese poet and writer, liver cancer.

25
Elmer H. Antonsen, 78, American philologist.
Randa Chahal Sabag, 54, Lebanese film maker, cancer.
Marpessa Dawn, 74, American actress (Black Orpheus), heart attack.
Kevin Duckworth, 44, American NBA basketball player, heart failure resulting from hypertrophic cardiomyopathy.
Ahmad Faraz, 74, Pakistani poet.
Hardwicke Knight, 97, New Zealand historian and photographer.
Pavle Kozjek, 49, Slovenian mountaineer, climbing accident.
Jabir Herbert Muhammad, 79, American businessman, long-time manager of Muhammad Ali, complications from heart surgery.
Vassili Nesterenko, 73, Belarusian physicist.
Pehr Henrik Nordgren, 64, Finnish composer, cancer.
Mario Fernando Peña Angulo, 56, Peruvian congressman, lymphoma.
Josef Tal, 97, Israeli composer, natural causes.
John Thoday, 91, British geneticist.

26
Pierre Colas, 32, German Mayanist scholar, assistant professor in anthropology at Vanderbilt University, shot.
Bobby Cummings, 72, English footballer (Aberdeen, Newcastle United).
Bob Mountford, 56, British footballer (Port Vale, Rochdale), cancer.
Edgardo Vega Yunqué, 72, Puerto Rican novelist.
Hazel Warp, 93, American stuntwoman (Gone with the Wind).
Barbara Warren, 65, American triathlete, bicycle crash.

27
Sally Abston, 74, American surgeon and scientist, kidney failure and hypertension.
Del Martin, 87, American gay rights activist, first legal same-sex marriage in California, complications from bone fracture.
Isa Meireles, 76, Portuguese journalist and writer.
Chittaranjan Mitra, 82, Indian scientist and administrator.
Abie Nathan, 81, Israeli peace activist, founder of Voice of Peace radio station.
Mark Priestley, 32, Australian actor (All Saints), suicide.
Olavo Setúbal, 85, Brazilian politician and banker, mayor of São Paulo (1975–1979), heart failure.

28
İlhan Berk, 89, Turkish poet.
Harold Challenor, 86, British war hero (Operation Speedwell) and corrupt Metropolitan police officer.
Phil Hill, 81, American racing driver, 1961 Formula One world champion, complications of Parkinson's disease.
Ralph Kovel, 88, American antiques expert and author, complications of broken hip.
Gilbert Moorer, 67, American rhythm & blues singer (The Esquires), complications from throat cancer.
Chidananda Saraswati, 91, Indian spiritual leader, president of the Divine Life Society.
Sigurbjörn Einarsson, 97, Icelandic bishop of the Church of Iceland (1959–1981).
Wonderful Smith, 97, American comedian, natural causes.
Michel Vastel, 68, Canadian journalist and columnist, throat cancer.

29
William Appling, 75, American conductor, pianist, educator and arranger.
Bridget Cracroft-Eley, 74, British Lord-Lieutenant of Lincolnshire since 1995.
Jayshree Gadkar, 66, Indian actress.
David Gordon Allen d'Aldecamb Lumsden, 75, British Garioch Pursuivant.
Geoffrey Perkins, 55, British comedy producer, writer and performer, head of comedy for BBC, road accident.
Peter Snow, 81, British artist and theatre designer.

30
K. K. Birla, 89, Indian industrialist and politician, after brief illness.
Tommy Bolt, 92, American professional golfer, 1958 U.S. Open champion, liver failure.
Robin Bullough, 78, British mathematical physicist.
Brian Hambly, 71, Australian rugby league player.
Killer Kowalski, 81, Canadian professional wrestler, heart attack.
Eldon Rathburn, 92, Canadian composer, after brief illness.
*Gilberto Rincón Gallardo, 69, Mexican politician, presidential candidate.
William Howard Wriggins, 90, American academic, ambassador to Sri Lanka and Maldives (1977–1979).

31
Cynthia Ahearn, 55, American echinodermologist and museum specialist.
Meir Avizohar, 84, Israeli politician and academic.
Jean-Marie Berckmans, 54, Belgian writer, lung disease.
Ken Campbell, 66, British actor (A Fish Called Wanda).
Jamie Dolan, 39, British footballer (Motherwell F.C.), heart attack.
Harmohinder Singh Gill, 75, Indian-born American scientist.
Edwin O. Guthman, 89, American Pulitzer Prize–winning journalist, amyloidosis.
Ike Pappas, 75, American CBS journalist, broadcast murder of Lee Harvey Oswald, heart failure.
Victor Yates, 69, New Zealand rugby footballer.
Magomed Yevloyev, 37, Ingush journalist and owner of the opposition news website Ingushetiya.ru, shot.

References

2008-08
 08